Anthene barnesi, the Barnes's hairtail, is a butterfly in the family Lycaenidae. It is found in Zimbabwe (the Vumba Mountains). The habitat consists of forests.

Adults of both sexes mud-puddle. They are on wing from September to May.

References

Butterflies described in 1940
Anthene
Endemic fauna of Zimbabwe
Butterflies of Africa